Cochran is a surname.

Cochran may also refer to:

Cochran, Arizona
Cochran, Georgia
Cochran, Indiana
Cochran, Tennessee
Cochran, Texas
Cochran, Virginia

See also
 Cochran frog (disambiguation)
 Cochrane (disambiguation)